Metekhal  is a village in the Chanditala I community development block of Srirampore subdivision in the Hooghly district of the Indian state of West Bengal.

Geography

Gram panchayat
Villages and census towns in Bhagabatipur gram panchayat are: Bhadua, Bhagabatipur, Jalamadul, Kanaidanga, Metekhal and Singjor.

Demographics
As per 2011 Census of India, Metekhal had a total population of 3,006 of which 1,559 (52%) were males and 1,447 (48%) were females. Population below 6 years was 419. The total number of literates in Metekhal was 2,266 (87.59% of the population over 6 years).

References

Villages in Chanditala I CD Block